Domingo Mendy (born 1870, date of death unknown) was a Uruguayan épée, foil and sabre fencer. He competed in five events at the 1924 Summer Olympics.

References

External links
 

1870 births
Year of death missing
Uruguayan male épée fencers
Uruguayan male foil fencers
Uruguayan male sabre fencers
Olympic fencers of Uruguay
Fencers at the 1924 Summer Olympics
20th-century Uruguayan people